The Pleasure To Remain So Heartless is the second album from Bremerton, Washington band Kane Hodder. It was released in 2004 by Suburban Home Records, and re-released in 2005 on Fueled by Ramen records with new artwork, and a bonus DVD which features live performances, as well as the music video for "I Think Patrick Swayze is Sexy".

Track listing
 "Last of the Anti-Fascist Warriors"
 "I Think Patrick Swayze Is Sexy"
 "Jason Dean Was a Teen Liberator"
 "Too Much Eddie Kenndricks, Not Enough David Ruffin"
 "Heaven Help Me! I Love a Psychotic!"
 "A Machine in the World of Man"
 "You Sign Your Crimes With a Silver Bullet"
 "The Child of Prophecy"
 "Crushing Everything in Sight"
 "Attack on Tir Asleen"
 "Assault at First Light"

References

External links
Kane Hodder's The Pleasure To Remain So Heartless Page

2005 albums
Fueled by Ramen albums
Kane Hodder (band) albums